FC Speranis Nisporeni is a Moldovan football club based in Nisporeni. They play in the Moldovan Liga 1, the second tier of Moldovan football.

History
The club was founded on 20 March 2019. It was founded as FC Sporting Trestieni and started playing in the third tier. In 2021, the club earned promotion to the second tier. In the summer of 2022, the club was renamed FC Speranis Nisporeni.

Honours
Divizia B
Winners (1): 2020–21

List of seasons

References

External links
FC Speranis Nisporeni on FootballFacts.ru 
FC Speranis Nisporeni on Soccerway

Football clubs in Moldova
Association football clubs established in 2019
2019 establishments in Moldova